Dinar Líneas Aéreas was an Argentine airline, which operated between 1992 and 2002. It offered various charter flights as well as regular flights to different locations in Argentina and South America. In its period of greatest commercial success, Dinar was known for its safety, punctuality, and exclusive menu supervised by the chef Gato Dumas.

History

The airline started operations in 1992, initially serving tourist destinations on a charter basis. Scheduled flights commenced in 1994.  Dinar served the following scheduled destinations: Buenos Aires, Comodoro Rivadavia, Córdoba, Jujuy, Mar del Plata, Mendoza, Puerto Madryn, Río Gallegos, Salta, Santiago del Estero and Tucumán. The airline was acquired by American Falcon in August 2002 for an undisclosed price. The new owner would absorb a  debt. In February 2003, Dinar was grounded for failing to comply with the local regulations regarding wet-leased aircraft. Operations resumed on 11 March 2003. Since August 2002, the airline went through several groundings and ownership changes.

 the general manager was Jorge Molle, who employed 620 people. The airline's main base at this time was Aeroparque Jorge Newbery.

Fleet 

Dinar operated the following aircraft:
Boeing 737-200
Boeing 757-200
Douglas DC-9-40
McDonnell Douglas MD-81
Fokker F-28 Mk 1000

See also 
 List of defunct airlines of South America

References 

			 

Defunct airlines of Argentina
Airlines established in 1992
Airlines disestablished in 2002
2002 disestablishments in Argentina
Argentine companies established in 1992